Sérgio Felipe Soares, or simply Sérgio Baresi (born January 2, 1973, in Óleo, São Paulo) is a former Brazilian football player at the position of centre back. Nowadays, he is São Paulo (U-20) manager.

References

1973 births
Living people
Brazilian footballers
São Paulo FC players
São Paulo FC managers
Brazilian football managers
Association football defenders
Footballers from São Paulo (state)
São Paulo FC non-playing staff